The Hunger is a British/Canadian television horror anthology series, co-produced by Scott Free Productions, Telescene Film Group Productions and the Canadian premium television channel The Movie Network. It was created by Jeff Fazio.

Originally shown on the Sci Fi Channel in the UK, The Movie Network in Canada and Showtime in the United States, the series was broadcast from 1997 to 2000, and is internally organized into two seasons. Each episode was based around an independent story introduced by the host; Terence Stamp hosted each episode for the first season, and was replaced in the second season by David Bowie. Stories tended to focus on themes of self-destructive desire and obsession, with a strong component of soft-core erotica; popular tropes for the stories included cannibalism, vampires, sex, and poison.

Episodes

Season 1 (1997–1998)

Season 2 (1999–2000)

Home releases
Region 1

Entertainment One released both seasons on DVD in the US in 2009. Season 1 was released on June 2, 2009 and Season 2 on October 13, 2009.

Alliance Home Entertainment has released the entire series on DVD in Canada for the very first time.

Region 2

Infinity Video released both seasons on DVD in the UK for the very first time on October 31, 2005 as Amazon exclusives. Season 1 and 2 were re-released as full retail releases in 2007.

See also
 "Replacements" by Lisa Tuttle (adapted as episode 12 of season 2)
 Alcoa Presents: One Step Beyond
 The Outer Limits
 Night Gallery
 Tales from the Crypt
 The X-Files
 List of horror television programs

References

External links
 

1997 British television series debuts
1997 Canadian television series debuts
2000 British television series endings
2000 Canadian television series endings
1990s British drama television series
2000s British drama television series
1990s British horror television series
2000s British horror television series
1990s Canadian drama television series
2000s Canadian drama television series
Erotic television series
British horror fiction television series
Canadian horror fiction television series
Television series by Scott Free Productions
Television series by Entertainment One
1990s British anthology television series
2000s British anthology television series
1990s Canadian anthology television series
Showtime (TV network) original programming
Syfy original programming
Television shows set in London
Television shows filmed in Montreal
Cannibalism in fiction
Vampires in television
2000s Canadian anthology television series